Biketawa is one of the twenty-four small islets which comprise the atoll of Tarawa in the Republic of Kiribati. The capital of Kiribati, South Tarawa, is located on Tarawa.

The 2000 Biketawa Declaration on Pacific regional security takes its name from Biketawa.

References 

Tarawa
Islands of Kiribati